is a volcanic group of lava domes surrounding Lake Shikaribetsu in Hokkaidō, Japan. The Shikaribetsu volcanic group is located in Daisetsuzan National Park. The volcanic group lies on the Kurile arc of the Pacific ring of fire. 

The volcanic group includes the following peaks:

 Mount Higashi Nupukaushi
 Mount Nishi Nupukaushi
 Mount Tenbo
 Mount Hakuun

See also
List of volcanoes in Japan

References
 
 Shikaribetsu Volcanic Group, Quaternary Volcanoes of Japan, Geological Survey of Japan, AIST., 2006

Volcanoes of Hokkaido
Pleistocene lava domes
Volcanic groups
Volcanism of Japan